Clayton Ely Oriani Junior (born November 8, 1988 in Piracicaba), simply known as Clayton, is a Brazilian footballer who plays for XV de Piracicaba as midfielder.

Career statistics

References

External links

1988 births
Living people
Brazilian footballers
Association football midfielders
Esporte Clube XV de Novembro (Piracicaba) players
People from Piracicaba
Footballers from São Paulo (state)